The Ambassador of the United Kingdom to Côte d'Ivoire is the United Kingdom's foremost diplomatic representative to the Ivory Coast, and head of the UK's diplomatic mission in Abidjan. 

The British embassy in Abidjan was closed in 2005 because of the worsening security situation
and the mission to Ivory Coast was temporarily operated out of the embassy in neighbouring Ghana. The embassy in Abidjan was reopened in May 2012.

List of heads of mission

Ambassador Extraordinary and Plenipotentiary
1960–1964: Thomas Ravensdale (also to Dahomey, Niger and Upper Volta)
1964–1967: Thomas Shaw (also to Niger and Upper Volta, and to Dahomey 1964–65)
1967–1970: Dudley Cheke (also to Niger and Upper Volta)
1970–1972: Peter Murray (also to Niger and Upper Volta)
1972–1975: Paul Holmer (also to Niger and Upper Volta)
1975–1978: Joe Wright (also to Niger and Upper Volta)
1978–1983: Michael Daly (also to Niger and Upper Volta)
1983–1987: John Willson (also to Burkina (formerly Upper Volta) and Niger)
1987–1990: Veronica Sutherland
1990–1997: Margaret Rothwell (also to Niger, Burkina and Liberia)
1997–2001: Haydon Warren-Gash (also to Niger, Burkina Faso and Liberia)
2001–2004: Francois Gordon
2004–2006: David Coates
2006–2007: Gordon Wetherell (non-resident)
2007–2011: Nicholas James Westcott  (non-resident)
2012–2014: Simon Tonge
2014–2016: Mark Bensberg

2016–2020: Josephine Gauld
2020–: Catherine Brooker

References

External links
UK and Cote d’Ivoire, gov.uk

Ivory Coast
 
United Kingdom